Robert T. Huber (August 29, 1920October 20, 1991) was an American politician. He was the 65th and 67th Speaker of the Wisconsin State Assembly.  He served a total of 23 years in the Assembly—from 1949 to 1972—and was Democratic leader in the Assembly for 17 years.

Biography
Huber was born on August 29, 1920, in Eckelson, North Dakota. In his youth, he moved to Wisconsin and graduated from West Allis Central High School in West Allis, Wisconsin.  He worked as a contractor and sold auto parts and merchandise.

Huber was first elected to the Assembly in 1948.  He was chosen as Minority Leader in the 1955-1956 session, and subsequently served as the Democrats' leader in the minority until 1965, when the Democrats gained the majority.  Huber was Speaker for the 1965-1966 session, before returning to the minority for another four years.  He served as Speaker when the Democrats again retook the majority in 1971, but resigned in 1972 to accept an appointment to become Chair of the State Highway Commission.

Personal life and family

Huber married Beatrice Bartlein in 1944. They had two children.  Huber was a member of the Catholic Church, the Knights of Columbus, the Society of the Holy Name and the Brewery Workers' Union.  He died on October 20, 1991.

References

External links

The Political Graveyard

|-

|-

People from Barnes County, North Dakota
People from West Allis, Wisconsin
Catholics from Wisconsin
Catholics from North Dakota
Speakers of the Wisconsin State Assembly
Democratic Party members of the Wisconsin State Assembly
1920 births
1991 deaths
20th-century American politicians